"Anthemic" is a song by live electronic music project Magnetic Man. It is the fourth single to be released from the debut album Magnetic Man and was released as a digital download on 22 July 2011. For its release, grime rapper P Money was added to the track – with the version serving as the lead promotion for the release. The single version premiered in May 2011 during Magnetic Man's performance at BBC Radio 1's Big Weekend.

Music video
A music video to accompany the release of "Anthemic" was first released onto YouTube on 30 June 2011 at a total length of three minutes and forty-nine seconds.

Track listing

Charts

Release history

References

2011 songs
2011 singles
Magnetic Man songs
Sony Music UK singles